The L.W. Shevling Ranch, in Harding County, South Dakota, dates from 1883.  A  portion was listed on the National Register of Historic Places in 1987.

It is located east of Harding in the West Short Pine Hills area.

The listing included 12 contributing buildings and two contributing structures. The oldest building, a log structure, is believed to have been built in 1883.

References

Ranches on the National Register of Historic Places in South Dakota
Log buildings and structures
National Register of Historic Places in Harding County, South Dakota
Buildings and structures completed in 1883